Kerim, Son of the Sheik (also known just as Son of the Sheik) is a 1962 Italian-French adventure film directed by Mario Costa and starring Gordon Scott.

Plot

Cast 

Gordon Scott as Kerim
Cristina Gaioni as  Fawzia
Moira Orfei as  Zaira
Alberto Farnese as  Omar
Gordon Mitchell as  Yussuf
Grazia Maria Spina as  Laila
Nando Tamberlani as  Mansur
 Luciano Benetti as  Prince Ahmed
Jany Clair as Prisoner
Nando Angelini as  Akim

References

External links

Italian adventure films
French adventure films
1962 adventure films
Films directed by Mario Costa
Films scored by Francesco De Masi
1960s Italian-language films
1960s French films
1960s Italian films